Madhupur is a town of Madhupur Upazila, Tangail, Bangladesh.

Demographics
According to the 2011 Bangladesh census, Madhupur town had 13,713 households and a population of 56,342. The literacy rate (age 7 and over) was 56.7% (male: 58.7%, female: 54.5%).

See also
 Dhanbari
 Ghatail
 Jalchatra Bazaar, Bangladesh

References

Populated places in Tangail District
Pourashavas of Bangladesh